"'t Is Stil in Amsterdam" by Ramses Shaffy
 "A Bar In Amsterdam" by Katzenjammer
 "A Windmill in Old Amsterdam" by Ted Dicks and Myles Rudge
 "Aan de Amsterdamse grachten", lyrics by Pieter Goemans in 1949, composed by Dick Schallies. Most famous interpretation was sung by Wim Sonneveld.
 "All of the Stars" by Ed Sheeran
 "American in Amsterdam" by Wheatus
 "Amesterdão (Have Big Fun)" by Mão Morta
 "Amsterdam" by Buck Owens
 "Amsterdam" by John Cale
 "Amsterdam" by CirKus
 "Amsterdam" by Coldplay
 "Amsterdam" by Dropgun
 "Amsterdam" by Richard Clapton
 "Amsterdam" by Crowded House
 "Amsterdam" by Daughter 
 "Amsterdam" by The Dreadnoughts
 "Amsterdam" by Fettes Brot
 "Amsterdam" by FLEMMING
 "Amsterdam" by Nephew (Danish band)
 "Blind Man in Amsterdam" by George Ezra
 "Amsterdam" by Gregory Alan Isakov
 "Amsterdam" by Guster
 "Amsterdam" by Imagine Dragons
 "Amsterdam" by Jacques Brel
 "Amsterdam" by Katya Sambuca
 "Amsterdam" by Kevin Coyne
 "Amsterdam" by Liesbeth List
 "Amsterdam" by Alice Phoebe Lou
 "Amsterdam" by Maggie MacNeal
 "Amsterdam" by Mando Diao
 "Amsterdam" by Nothing but Thieves
 "Amsterdam" by Ørjan Nilsen
 "Amsterdam" by Peter Bjorn and John
 "Amsterdam" by Pool
 "Amsterdam" by Psoy Korolenko
 "Amsterdam" by Riblja Čorba
 "Amsterdam" by Rico Love
 "Amsterdam" by Scott Walker
 "Amsterdam" by Shane Alexander
 "Amsterdam" by Van Halen
 "Amsterdam" by Wouter Hamel
 "Amsterdam Crown" by Eszter Balint
 "Amsterdam, the first days" by Brainbox
 "Artis" by Spinvis
 "Big City" by Tol Hansse
 "Bij ons in de Jordaan" by Johnny Jordaan
 "Brak Obama" by Stepherd & Skinto
 "Centraal Station" by Danique
 "Dans Le Port d'Amsterdam" by Jaques Brel
 "De stad Amsterdam" by Acda en De Munnik
 "De Pijp" by Sophie Straat
 "Dutch TV" by Saint Etienne
 "Een Barkie" by De Jeugd van Tegenwoordig
 "Falcons" by Amanda Bergman
 "Geef mij maar Amsterdam" by Johnny Jordaan
 "Geluk" by Sophie Straat
 "Groen Amsterdam" by Sophie Straat
 "Hallelujah Amsterdam" by Ramses Shaffy
 "Heart of Amsterdam" by The Gentle Storm
 "Hee Amsterdam" by Drukwerk
 "Hello Amsterdam" by Doug Sahm
 "Hey Yvonne" by Sophie Straat
 "Houndog" by Cold Chisel
 "Ik verveel me zo (in Amsterdam-Noord)" by Drukwerk, music from Dylan's "A Hard Rain's a-Gonna Fall"
 "In Amsterdam" by Paul Weller
 "Jessie" by Sophie Straat
 "Kalverstraat" by Willy Alberti
 "Kamer in Amsterdam" by De Mens
 "Kinderpsycholoog" by Sophie Straat
 "Little Amsterdam" by Tori Amos
 "Lost in Amsterdam" by Parov Stelar Band
 "Lost Weekend" by Lloyd Cole
 "Maar in Amsterdam" Lenny Kuhr
 "Mary Jane Holland" by Lady Gaga
 "Mijn Stad" by Danny de Munk
 "My Killer My Shadow" by Golden Earring
 "Origineel Amsterdams" by Osdorp Posse
 "Pijpenstelen" by Herman van Veen
 "Port of Amsterdam" by David Bowie, music based on Jacques Brel's Port d'Amsterdam.
 "Streets of Amsterdam" by Richard Ashcroft
 "The Magician" by Dizzy
 "Three Jolly Fishermen" (children's folk song)
 "Too Much Brandy" by The Streets
 "Tulpen uit Amsterdam" by Max Bygraves (original in Dutch by Herman Emmink)
 "Vondelpark"  by The 1990s
 "Vondelpark Vannacht" by Acda & De Munnik

 “Meet Me in Amsterdam” by RINI

References

External links
Amsterdams lijflied, series of articles from Het Parool on Amsterdam songs

Amsterdam

Songs